Vokolida is a village in the Famagusta District of Cyprus, located on the Karpas Peninsula. It is under the de facto control of Northern Cyprus.

The Bafra region has been designated a holiday resort with luxury hotels "Bafra Beach" for tourist expansion by the North Cyprus government.

References

External links
BafraBeach.com Mediterranean's new insider vacation resort in Cyprus offers luxury hotels, best beaches, tours, casinos, aqua park, spa, diving and top vacation.

Populated places in İskele District